Glasgow HSFP are a former rugby union team that played their home games at Glasgow, Scotland.

The team was founded in 1884 by former pupils of the High School of Glasgow. The team no longer exists.

In 1982 it merged with the Kelvinside Academicals - the rugby team of another school; the Kelvinside Academy - to form a rugby club called Glasgow High Kelvinside.

In 1997, Glasgow High Kelvinside merged with Glasgow Academicals to form Glasgow Hawks. Both GHK and Academicals survived the merger as spin-offs from the Hawks.

History

Founded in 1884, Glasgow High School Former Pupils formed a rugby club. They played on a ground on the opposite side of Crow Road in Anniesland, Glasgow to the present pitches. Their first match was played against the 1st Lanark Volunteers.

The club played at various locations in the Anniesland area until the early years of the Twentieth Century. 

The club became an open club in 1973. It dropped the F.P. from its name and became known as Glasgow High RFC.

Glasgow HSFP Sevens

Glasgow HSFP ran a Sevens tournament in 1929.

Notable former players

Scotland internationalists

The following former Glasgow HSFP players have represented Scotland at full international level.

Glasgow District

The following former Glasgow HSFP players have represented Glasgow District at provincial level.

Honours

 Scottish Unofficial Championship
 Champions (5): 1923-24 (shared with Glasgow Academicals), 1935-36, 1950-51, 1953-54, 1961-62
 Glasgow City Sevens
 Champions (2): 1935, 1964
 Gala Sevens
 Champions (1): 1950
 Ayr Sevens
 Champions: 1967, 1968, 1970, 1976
 Kilmarnock Sevens
 Champions: 1937, 1973
 Allan Glen's Sevens
 Champions: 1976
 Glasgow Academicals Sevens
 Champions: 1974
 Bearsden Sevens
 Champions: 1971
 Clarkston Sevens
 Champions: 1970, 1973, 1982
 Glasgow University Sevens
 Champions: 1898, 1949, 1956, 1967, 1973
 Hillhead HSFP Sevens
 Champions: 1972, 1973
 Edinburgh Borderers Sevens
 Champions: 1926
 Helensburgh Sevens
 Champions: 1973
 Kelvinside Academicals Sevens
 Champions: 1922
 Hutchesons' GSFP Sevens
 Champions: 1926

References

Rugby clubs established in 1884
Rugby union in Glasgow
Scottish rugby union teams
Defunct Scottish rugby union clubs
Rugby union clubs disestablished in 1982
1884 establishments in Scotland
1982 disestablishments in Scotland